Medical Stores Department (MSD) was established by the Act of Parliament No.13 of 1993 as an autonomous department under the Ministry of Health, Social Development, Gender, Elderly and Children responsible for develop, maintain and manage an efficient and cost effective system of procurement, storage and distribution of approved medicines and medical supplies required for use by the public health services as the Ministry of Health, Social Development, Gender, Elderly and Children may from time to time approve.

Corporate Affairs

Ownership 
The Medical Stores Department is a parastatal agency wholly owned by the Government of Tanzania.

Governance 
The company is an autonomous agency under the Ministry of Health and is governed by a board of trustees. The Board composed of nine members appointed every three years. The Chairman appointed by the President of the United Republic of Tanzania, eight members are appointed by the Minister responsible for health. The Board delegates the day to day management of the department operations to Director General who is appointed by the President of the United Republic of Tanzania.

Branch Network 

The department operates through eight zonal stores in Dar-es-salaam, Mwanza, Iringa, Moshi, Mbeya, Tabora, Dodoma and Mtwara supported by two Sales Points in Tanga and Muleba. MSD is annually audited by CAG and has fully-fledged competent internal audit Unit that oversees internal controls effectiveness of each individual store and its supply chain.

References

External links

 

Government agencies of Tanzania
Medical and health organisations based in Tanzania